KXLY-FM (99.9 MHz) is a commercial FM radio station in Spokane, Washington, that airs a country music radio format. The station is owned by Morgan Murphy Media, with the license held by QueenB Radio, Inc. KXLY-FM calls itself "The Big 99.9 Coyote Country."   Weekdays begin with "The Jay and Kevin Show." Jay and Kevin have been doing morning radio in Spokane since February 13, 1995, and joined Morgan Murphy Media on May 15, 2009.

The studios and offices are on West Boone Avenue in Spokane.  The transmitter is on North Summit Road, atop Mount Spokane.  The signal can be heard in parts of Washington, Idaho, Montana and British Columbia, and it operates translator stations in three communities. KXLY-FM is one of seven local Spokane FM radio stations heard across Canada to subscribers of the Shaw Direct satellite TV service.

History

Beautiful music
KXLY-FM first signed on the air in September 1959.  It was the FM counterpart to KXLY (AM 920), owned by the Northern Pacific Radio and Television Corporation, which also owned KXLY-TV. KXLY-FM was Spokane's second FM station after KREM-FM (now co-owned KZZU-FM). Initially, KXLY-FM had an effective radiated power (ERP) of only 2,000 watts, a fraction of its current output. It mostly simulcast the AM station at first.

In the early 1960s, KXLY-FM was separately programmed with a largely automated beautiful music format. It played fifteen minute sweeps of instrumental music, mostly cover versions of popular songs, along with Broadway and Hollywood showtunes. KXLY-FM continued as an easy listening station for nearly three decades.  In 1962, KXLY-AM-FM-TV were acquired by the Spokane Television Company.  Spokane Television was later merged into Morgan Murphy Media, based in Madison, Wisconsin.

Soft AC and AAA
In the 1990s, the easy listening audience was starting to age, while most advertisers seek a younger demographic. KXLY-FM added more soft vocals to its playlist, hoping to attract younger listeners. It used the slogan "It's the music KXLY-FM 100". By the late 1990s, the station made the transition to all vocals as a soft adult contemporary station. It was known as "Classy 99.9fm" and competes against KISC-FM KISS 98.1 FM.

But with several other AC stations on the air in Spokane, KXLY-FM had trouble reaching an audience. On September 12, 2006, the station switched to an adult album alternative (AAA) format branded as "Spokane's River 99dot9."

Country music
As the first decade of the 2000s was ending, Morgan Murphy Media decided to make a bold move. The Spokane radio market already had two successful country music stations, KDRK, owned by Citadel Broadcasting, and KIXZ, owned by Clear Channel Communications.  KDRK and KIXZ were both often in the top ten in the Arbitron ratings.

On January 1, 2010, KXLY-FM's AAA format moved to co-owned KEZE, which had switched to country a couple of years earlier, while KEZE's country format moved to KXLY-FM. KXLY-FM became the third full-power FM station in Spokane with a country format, calling itself "The Big 99.9 Coyote Country." Premiering on day one was the morning show duo "Jay & Kevin" who moved from competing station KDRK-FM.

KXLY-FM is often Spokane's top country station.  (KIXZ, now owned by iHeartMedia, left the country format, switching to alternative rock as KFOO-FM, while KEZE has switched to rhythmic contemporary music.)

Translators
KXLY-FM also rebroadcasts on the following translators:

National radio shows
 The Big Time with Whitney Allen
 CMT Country Countdown USA with Lon Helton

References

External links

Morgan Murphy Media stations
XLY-FM
Radio stations established in 1959
1959 establishments in Washington (state)
Country radio stations in the United States